The Curaçao International Championships or Internationale Kampioenschappen van Curaçao or simply known as the Curaçao International was a men's and women's  international hard court tennis tournament established in 1965. It was played on outdoor courts at the  Curaçao Sport Club, Willemstad, Curaçao, Netherlands Antilles until 1970. It was part of the South Florida-Caribbean tennis circuit during its run.

History
The Curaçao International Championships were founded as a permanent fixture in 1965 (although international tournaments were staged in Curaçao as early as the 1940s). The championships were last played at the Curaçao Sport Club, Willemstad, Curaçao, in what was then the Netherlands Antilles. The tournament was part of the Caribbean Circuit which was a major feature of the international tennis scene from the 1930s to early 1970s. In 1970 it formed part of the circuit that year that included tournaments in Caracas, Barranquilla , Jacksonville, San Juan, St. Petersberg, Mexico City and Houston, the Curaçao event offered $10,000 in prize money for the first time.

Finals

Men's Singles
Incomplete roll
Results included:

Women's Singles
Incomplete roll

References

Hard court tennis tournaments
Defunct tennis tournaments in Curaçao